Preti is an Italian surname. Notable people with the surname include:

Alessandro Preti (born 1992), Italian volleyball player
Armando Preti (born 1911), Italian footballer
Francesco Maria Preti (1701–1774), Italian Baroque architect
Gaetano Preti, Italian artistic gymnast
George Preti, American chemist
Gregorio Preti (1603–1672), Italian Baroque painter
Jean-Louis Preti (1798–1881), French chess writer
Luigi Preti (1914–2009), Italian politician
Luis Preti (born 1983), Ecuadorian footballer
Mattia Preti (1613–1699), Italian Baroque painter

Italian-language surnames